Rzepiska may refer to:

Rzepiska, Lesser Poland Voivodeship (south Poland)
Rzepiska, Podlaskie Voivodeship (north-east Poland)
Rzepiska, Pomeranian Voivodeship (north Poland)